Mayor of Macao may refer to:

 Governor of Macau, during its colonial period
 Chief Executive of Macau, following its return to China as a Special Administrative Region